Kuvatovo (Qıwat) is a rural locality (a village) in Abdulkarimovsky Selsoviet, Baymaksky District, Bashkortostan, Russia. The population was 198 as of 2010. There are 6 streets.

Geography 
Kuvatovo is located 44 km southwest of Baymak (the district's administrative centre) by road. Abdulkarimovo is the nearest rural locality.

References 

Rural localities in Baymaksky District